Connor Neil Ralph Wickham (born 31 March 1993) is an English professional footballer who plays as a forward for  club Cardiff City. 

He has previously represented Ipswich Town, Sunderland, Sheffield Wednesday, Leeds United, Crystal Palace, Preston North End, Milton Keynes Dons and Forest Green Rovers.

Wickham has also played at various levels of international football for the England national team, and scored the winning goal in the 2010 UEFA European U17 Championship Final.

Early life
Wickham was born in Hereford, the son of an Army Warrant Officer. He attended Philip Morant School in Colchester, where he achieved eight A-C grade GCSEs – as well as being a prominent member of the school football team, where he was a prolific goalscorer from a young age. He played youth football with Reading for four years. Wickham's father is Northern Irish.

Club career

Ipswich Town

2008–09
Wickham made his debut for the Ipswich Town first team on 11 April 2009, aged 16 years and 11 days. He came on as a 66th-minute substitute for Veliče Šumulikoski in a 3–1 home defeat against Doncaster Rovers and in doing so he became Ipswich's youngest ever player, beating the previous record being held by Jason Dozzell by 46 days.

2009–10

Wickham scored his first two senior goals in only his fourth appearance, when he scored in Ipswich's 2009–10 League Cup tie against Shrewsbury Town. He also scored in the penalty shootout, which saw Ipswich prevail 4–2. He scored his first league goal in a 1–0 home victory over Scunthorpe United in March 2010, his winning effort coming deep into injury time. In April 2010, Wickham scored his second league goal, which came in the 90th minute in a 3–1 victory over Derby County. This came two days after he signed his first professional contract at Ipswich, a two-year deal following his 17th birthday.

In April 2010, Wickham was named the Football League young player of the month. He won the award after scoring three goals in four matches during that time.

2010–11
Wickham extended his contract with Ipswich to 2013 in January 2011. It had an offer clause in it which stated that if any bid equalled or bettered the one written in the contract, Ipswich would have to allow him to speak to the bidding club. It was reported that the figure was around the £15 million mark.

On 22 January 2011, Wickham scored Ipswich's his first goal of the season in a 3–2 win over Doncaster Rovers. Two games later, Wickham scored in a 3–0 win over Sheffield United at Portman Road. A clearance of a set piece saw Wickham collect the ball in his own half, and pass two opponents before wrong-footing Rob Kozluk and goalkeeper Steve Simonsen to tap the ball into the net. Former Ipswich player, Kevin Beattie witnessed the goal, and described it as one of the greatest goals ever scored at Portman Road. Two weeks later Wickham recorded his first professional hat-trick in a 6–0 win at Doncaster Rovers. Wickham's superb scoring form continued when he scored late in the match against Reading on 8 March. With Ipswich already 3–0 down, his goal counted for little, although it was once again a superb finish, as he volleyed a ball that was coming over his shoulder into the top corner of the goal from a tight angle.

On 4 March 2011, Wickham was named Championship player of the month for February after scoring four goals in the month, including his first professional hat-trick at Doncaster. Two weeks later he was named the Football League Young Player of the Year as well as the Championship Apprentice of the Year at the 2011 Football League Awards.

On 2 April 2011, Tottenham Hotspur manager, Harry Redknapp admitted that his side had not made a bid for Wickham. This was despite several reports to the contrary suggesting a bid in the region of £10m had been made. The same day, Wickham scored the second of Ipswich's two goals against Burnley in the Championship, as they won 2–1.

He signed a one-year extension to his contract on 8 April 2011, contracting him to the club until the summer of 2014. Wickham admitted he was delighted to have signed the contract, and said he just wanted to concentrate on achieving his goals with Ipswich, rather than focusing on speculation about his future. He said:

Sunderland
On 29 June 2011, Wickham signed a four-year deal with Premier League club Sunderland for a fee of £8 million. The fee had the potential to rise to £12 million over the course of the contract.
Despite having recently signed a new contract with Ipswich, Wickham had been widely tipped to move to a Premier League club following a highly successful 2010–11 season. Although Ipswich manager Paul Jewell had said there was no pressure to sell the youngster, Sunderland's eventual offer proved too lucrative. The fee broke Ipswich's record for transfer fees recouped, and broke the transfer record for a Football League player moving to a Premier League club. Ipswich's chief executive Simon Clegg summed it up:

He scored his first goal for Sunderland in a pre-season friendly against Kilmarnock. Wickham made his first competitive appearance for Sunderland when he came on as a substitute in the 1–0 defeat to Newcastle United in the Tyne–Wear derby on 20 August 2011. He made his first Premier League start for Sunderland on 22 October 2011 where he helped Sunderland secure their second win of the season against Bolton Wanderers.

Wickham scored his first Premier League goal for the Black Cats a week later in the 2–2 draw with Aston Villa. The following week against Manchester United at Old Trafford, Wickham suffered a knee injury and had to be substituted just five minutes into the game. The arrival of new manager Martin O'Neill saw Wickham fall out of favour as he spent the majority of the remainder of the season on the bench and playing for the reserves. Wickham came off the bench at Bolton Wanderers in the third round of the FA Cup to score his first goal of the season as Sunderland came from 2–0 down to earn a replay.

Loan spells
On 8 February 2013, Wickham joined Sheffield Wednesday on loan, initially on a one-month deal. He made his debut on 9 February, in a 2–2 draw against Derby County. He scored his first goal for the club on 9 March, in a 1–0 win away against Leicester City in what was the last game of his loan spell, firing a first time volley into the roof of the net. On 14 March 2013 it was confirmed that Wickham would not be re-joining Sheffield Wednesday on loan.

On 27 August 2013, Wickham inspired Sunderland to a late comeback against Milton Keynes Dons in the Football League Cup, scoring twice and assisting Jozy Altidore's goal as the Premier League side scored four times in the last 20 minutes to win 4–2.

On 1 November 2013, Wickham re-joined Sheffield Wednesday in another loan move until 1 January 2014. Wickham scored on his return in the 5–2 win over Reading at Hillsborough on 2 November. Wickham again appeared on the score sheet scoring a brace of goals in the 2–1 win over Leicester City on 3 December. Four goals in four games in December 2013 earned Wickham a nomination for the December Championship Player of the Month award but he ultimately lost out to Leicester City's Danny Drinkwater. On 31 December 2013, his loan spell at Wednesday was extended by a further month, although his parent club prevented him from representing the Owls in the FA Cup. On 11 January 2014, he scored in Wednesday's 6–0 win over Yorkshire rivals Leeds United. After the game, he described the win as a "fantastic team performance" while saying that he was "unhappy with my own personal performance." He was recalled to his parent club on 27 January 2014.

On 26 February 2014, Wickham joined Football League Championship side Leeds United on loan until the end of the 2013–14 season. Wickham was handed the number 9 shirt for Leeds.
He made his debut on 1 March 2014 in a 1–1 draw away to Queens Park Rangers at Loftus Road.

Return to Sunderland
On 24 March, Wickham was recalled from his loan after playing four games for Leeds to bolster Sunderland's goal scoring options, with Steven Fletcher injured and Jozy Altidore badly out of form.

On 16 April, he scored two goals in a 2–2 draw with Manchester City at the City of Manchester Stadium. Three days later, he scored the club's first goal in Sunderland's 2–1 win against Chelsea at Stamford Bridge. On 27 April, he scored a brace to help Sunderland overcome Cardiff City 4–0, playing a pivotal role in Sunderland's late surge to try and avoid relegation. He was named Premier League Player of the Month for April. On 3 May, his cross assisted Sebastian Larsson's goal in a 1–0 win at Old Trafford, making it Sunderland's first win away to Manchester United since 1968.

On 4 October 2014, he scored his first goal of the season and assisted a Steven Fletcher goal in a 3–1 win over Stoke City. In December 2014, Connor Wickham agreed a new four-and-a-half-year deal with Sunderland.

Crystal Palace
On 3 August 2015, Wickham joined Crystal Palace on a five-year deal for an undisclosed fee, although some sources reported it as an initial £7 million, rising to a potential £9 million depending upon his performance. Wickham made his debut on 8 August 2015 as a second-half substitute in the 3–1 win at Norwich City.

In November 2016, Wickham sustained a serious knee injury which kept him out of first-team action until October 2018. He did not make an appearance in the starting line-up until January 2019, scoring the opening goal in a 2–0 fourth-round FA Cup win against Tottenham Hotspur.

In May 2019, Wickham signed a one-year extension to his existing contract keeping him at Palace until June 2021.

He joined Sheffield Wednesday on a six-month loan deal on 31 January 2020.

On 3 March 2021, he returned to the 2020–21 Crystal Palace match day squad, by being an unused substitute in a 0–0 draw against Manchester United in the Premier League.

Preston North End 
Wickham was released by Palace after his contract expired at the end of the 2020–21 season. He joined  Championship club Preston North End in September 2021 on a short term deal until January 2022. He impressed on his debut but suffered a serious hamstring injury after five minutes of an EFL Cup tie in his second appearance and did not play for the club again. Wickham was released by Preston North End on 13 January 2022.

Milton Keynes Dons 
On 21 January 2022, Wickham joined League One club Milton Keynes Dons on a short-term deal. He made his debut the following day, coming on as a 75th-minute substitute in a 1–0 home defeat to Doncaster Rovers. On 19 February 2022, Wickham scored his first goal for the club, the winning goal in a 2–1 away win over former club Sunderland. However, after limited opportunities, he was one of six players released by MK Dons at the end of the 2021–22 season.

Forest Green Rovers 
On 3 August 2022, Wickham joined newly-promoted League One club Forest Green Rovers on a short-term deal until January 2023. He left the club in January 2023 at the expiry of his contract, scoring 9 times in 20 total appearances for the club.

Cardiff City 
On 14 February 2023, Championship club Cardiff City signed Wickham until the end of the season.

International career
Wickham has played age-group matches for England, but is also eligible for Northern Ireland, as his father was born there. Until he receives a full cap from England in a competitive game he remains eligible for other teams. His progress in the English Premier League was also monitored by former Republic of Ireland management duo of Martin O'Neill and Roy Keane, as his links to Northern Ireland mean that he also qualifies to play for the Republic of Ireland.

England U16
Wickham has represented the England under-16 team and was also on stand-by for the under-17 squad during the 2008–09 season. He won the 2008 Victory Shield with England, scoring in the 2–0 final win over Scotland.

England U17
On 11 August 2009, Wickham received a call-up to the under-17 squad, for their three-game FA International Tournament, which would take place later that month.

In May 2010, Wickham was included in the England U17 squad for the UEFA European U17 Championship in Liechtenstein. He was involved in two of the goals in England's 3–1 win against the Czech Republic in the group stage, with a convincing performance. He then played the full game in the second group match against Greece, once again playing well. Wickham was rested for the final group game of the tournament, but returned to face France in the semi-final. He scored both goals for England in a 2–1 victory, both left-footed, and both in the first half. Wickham scored the winner in a 2–1 victory over Spain in the final. He received the ball on the edge of the box before proceeding to beat two defenders and drill the ball low into the net. He was given the Golden Player award by UEFA for the best player in the tournament.

England U21

On 7 September 2010 England under-21 boss Stuart Pearce admitted that he had been monitoring Wickham's progress, and that he would consider calling him up to the under-21 squad once he had recovered from injury. On 15 November 2010 Pearce did name Wickham in the under-21s friendly match against Germany on 16 November 2010. In that game he came on as a 66th-minute substitute in a 2–0 defeat for England. Following that game, and the important experience Wickham gained, he returned to the England under-19 side. However, it would not be long before he was back in the fold for the under-21s.

On 14 March 2011 it was announced that Wickham had been included in the squad for England's games against Denmark and Iceland. He came on as a substitute in the game against Denmark, which England went on to win 4–0. The following Monday, Wickham started the game in a friendly against Iceland at Deepdale in Preston. It was his first start for the under-21s, and he played the full 90 minutes as England lost the game 2–1 to a very strong Iceland side that included a number of first team regulars. Wickham played as a lone striker in the game.

Prior to the Iceland game, Wickham admitted that he was hopeful of being included in the squad that would play in the summer's Euro 2011 under-21s tournament due to take place in June. Having been an instrumental figure in the success of the under-17's the previous summer, he felt he could repeat the feat at a higher level. He said:

He scored his first goal for the under-21s on 10 September 2012, scoring the only goal of the game in a win against Norway in Chesterfield, ensuring England won their European Under-21 Championship qualifying group. He scored his second goal on 16 October, helping England to a 2–0 aggregate win in the play-off against Serbia.

Sponsorship
In 2010, Wickham signed a sponsorship deal with British sportswear and equipment supplier, Umbro. He appeared in an advert for the new England kit in September 2010 and is one of the flagship wearers of Umbro's GT range of football boots.

Career statistics

Honours
Crystal Palace
FA Cup runner-up: 2015–16

England U16
Victory Shield: 2008

England U17
UEFA European Under-17 Championship: 2010

Individual
Ipswich Town Young Player of the Year: 2008–09
UEFA European Under-17 Championship Golden Player: 2010
UEFA European Under-17 Championship Team of the Tournament: 2010
Football League Championship Player of the Month: February 2011
Football League Young Player of the Month: April 2010
Football League Young Player of the Year: 2011
Championship Apprentice Award: 2011
Premier League Player of the Month: April 2014
Sunderland Supporters' Young Player of the Year: 2014–15

References

External links

1993 births
Living people
Sportspeople from Hereford
English footballers
England youth international footballers
England under-21 international footballers
Association football forwards
Reading F.C. players
Ipswich Town F.C. players
Sunderland A.F.C. players
Sheffield Wednesday F.C. players
Leeds United F.C. players
Crystal Palace F.C. players
Preston North End F.C. players
Milton Keynes Dons F.C. players
Forest Green Rovers F.C. players
Cardiff City F.C. players
Premier League players
English Football League players
English people of Northern Ireland descent
FA Cup Final players
20th-century English people
21st-century English people